GNA University is a private university in Phagwara, Punjab, India. It was established in 2014 by State Government Punjab  in accordance with Act no. 17 of 2014. GNA group is a manufacturer of car parts.

GNA University offers courses in various fields such as Design, Engineering, Management, Animation, Hotel Management and Hospitality, Computer science, Business Studies and Physical Education. GNA University is awarded as 'Best University ATC 2017' by Parametric Technology Corporation (PTC) University, USA, during an event in Thailand.

Programs in GNA University 

GNA University offers Degree and Certificate courses in more than 50 programs. Post-Graduate and Graduate courses are offered in Engineering, Design, Management, Animation, Computer Science and Physical Education. The university also offers Diploma and Certificate programs in CAD-CAM and Engineering field.

Business School 
The University launched GNA Business School in year 2016, by Gurdeep Singh Sihra, and Prem Kumar. The B-School is established under the Faculty of Business Studies of GNA University.

Tie-Ups 
GNA University has MoU's and Tie-Ups with reputed organisations. GNA University has signed MoU with Cambridge University Press. The University also has MoU with TimesPro, which is an Initiative by The Times of India for Placement.

University has signed an MoU with La Verne, California for short term, and long-term programs along with Faculty and Student Exchange program. A MoU has also been Signed with National Stock Exchange of India Academy to offer programs to students of Management. LearnVern, An Online Learning portal also has signed MoU with GNA University. This university also joined Oracle Workforce Development Program (WDP) which is governed by Oracle University, USA, to develop students for latest industry trends.

GNA university has also a Tie-Up with Virohan Institute which provides a BBA course to the students under Hospital Management.

Events 

Punjab Spell Bee Championship is another event hosted by GNA University which is another state level competition.

Punjab Film Festival which was first of its kind event in the state of Punjab, was organised by GNA University in the month of March in which various films are showcased.

International Conference on Hospitality and Tourism was held in November, 2016 in university premises which was graced by various eminent personalities from the hospitality and tourism sector. more than 30 research papers were presented during the event.

The university also hosts Annual Sports Meet every year.

Baisakhi Mela is also one of the Mega event for the university. In year, 2018, Baisakhi Mela was celebrated along with Coke Studio Minicert in the campus premises in which Sharry Mann, one of the renowned singer of Punjab performed.

References

Film schools in India
Private universities in India
Universities in Punjab, India
Kapurthala district
Educational institutions established in 2014
2014 establishments in Punjab, India